Kosovka may refer to:

 Kosovka, Minsk Voblast, a town in Belarus
 Kosivka, Kirovohrad Oblast, a village in Ukraine
 Kosivka, Odessa Oblast, a village in Ukraine
 Kosovka (river), Krasnoyarsk Krai, Russia
 Kosovka devojka, a Serbian heroine, see Kosovo Maiden